Sir Ian Dixon Scott  (6 March 1909 – 3 March 2002) was a British civil servant and a career diplomat who served as Deputy Private Secretary to the last two Viceroys of India. He was later appointed Ambassador to Congo, Sudan and Norway in the 1960s.

Writings 
 Notes on Chitral (1937) 
 Tumbled House: the Congo at independence (1969) 
 A British Tale of Indian and Foreign Service (1999)

Personal life 
He married, in 1937, Drusilla Lindsay, daughter of Lord Lindsay, the former Master of Balliol. They had a son and four daughters.

Death 
Sir Ian Dixon Scott, died at Aldeburgh on 3 March 2002.

References

SCOTT, Sir Ian Dixon, Who Was Who, A & C Black, 1920–2016 (online edition, Oxford University Press, 2014) 

1909 births
2002 deaths
People educated at Inverness Royal Academy
Alumni of Queen's Royal College, Trinidad
Alumni of Balliol College, Oxford
Indian Civil Service (British India) officers
Ambassadors of the United Kingdom to the Democratic Republic of the Congo
Ambassadors of the United Kingdom to Sudan
Ambassadors of the United Kingdom to Norway